Tobias Anton "Toby" Roth (born October 10, 1938) is an American businessman, lobbyist, and former Republican U.S. Representative from Wisconsin. From 1979 to 1997, he served 9 consecutive terms in  Congress.

Early life and career 
Tony Roth served in the Wisconsin State Assembly from 1972 to 1978. He was also a lieutenant in the United States Army Reserve. Following his retirement from Congress, Roth moved to Great Falls, Virginia.

Congress 
Roth represented Wisconsin's 8th congressional district. He served in the United States House of Representatives from 1979, first being elected to the Ninety-sixth United States Congress. He was reelected to the succeeding eight congresses serving from January 3, 1979, until January 3, 1997, when he did not run for re-election.

Later career 
After leaving Congress in 1997, Roth opened a lobbying firm named the Roth Group. The firm was active for many years and remains in business.

Family 
His nephew, Roger Roth is a member of the Wisconsin State Senate.

References

External links

 

1938 births
Living people
Republican Party members of the Wisconsin State Assembly
United States Army officers
Military personnel from Wisconsin
People from Emmons County, North Dakota
Republican Party members of the United States House of Representatives from Wisconsin
People from Great Falls, Virginia

Members of Congress who became lobbyists